The 1889 Ohio gubernatorial election was held on November 5, 1889. Democratic nominee James E. Campbell defeated incumbent Republican Joseph B. Foraker with 48.91% of the vote.

General election

Candidates
Major party candidates
James E. Campbell, Democratic
Joseph B. Foraker, Republican 

Other candidates
John B. Helwig, Prohibition
John H. Rhodes, Union Labor

Results

References

1889
Ohio
1889 Ohio elections